Willy Van Rompaey (born 24 March 1911) was a sailor from Belgium, who represented his country at the 1928 Summer Olympics in Amsterdam, Netherlands. Van Rompaey, as crew member on the Belgian 6 Metre Ubu, took 5th place with helmsman A. J. J. Fridt and fellow crew members Ludovic Franck, Frits Mulder and Arthur Sneyers. He also competed in the 6 Metre event at the 1948 Summer Olympics.

References

Sources 
 

Sailors at the 1928 Summer Olympics – 6 Metre
Sailors at the 1948 Summer Olympics – 6 Metre
Olympic sailors of Belgium
1911 births
Belgian male sailors (sport)
Year of death missing
Sportspeople from Antwerp